The Florida Cracker Trail runs from just east of Bradenton, and ends in Fort Pierce, a total distance of approximately .

In years past, this route was used for both cattle and horses. Today it includes parts of State Road 66, State Road 64, and U.S. Highway 98.

On November 20, 2000, the Florida Cracker Trail was selected as a Community Millennium Trail. The Millennium Trails is a partnership among the White House Millennium Council, the Department of Transportation, Rails-to-Trails Conservancy, the National Endowment for the Arts and other public agencies and private organizations. The goal of Millennium Trails is the creation of a nationwide network of trails that protect natural environment, interpret history and culture, and enhance alternative transportation, recreation and tourism.

An annual Cracker Trail ride is now held the last full week in February of each year. 
Each day's ride is approximately 15 to 20 miles in length. The purpose of the ride is to draw attention to Florida's horse and cattle heritage.

See also 
 Florida cracker
 Cracker (white)

External links 
 Florida Cracker Trail Association
 Florida Greenways and Trails
 Multimedia story about the Florida Cracker Trail
 The Great Florida Cattle Drive – website about 2016 re-enactment of historical Florida cattle drives like those of the original Florida Cracker Trail

Florida cracker culture
Landmarks in Florida